The second government of Miguel Ángel Revilla was formed on 8 July 2019, following the latter's election as President of Cantabria by the Parliament of Cantabria on 27 June and his swearing-in on 29 June, as a result of the Regionalist Party of Cantabria (PRC) emerging as the largest parliamentary force at the 2019 regional election.

The cabinet comprises members of the PRC and the Spanish Socialist Workers' Party (PSOE), as well as a number of independents proposed by the former.

Investiture

Cabinet changes
Revilla's fourth government saw a number of cabinet changes during its tenure:
On 15 January 2021, it was announced that Francisco Martín would be replaced in his post as regional minister of Innovation, Industry, Transport and Trade by Francisco Javier López Marcano, in order for the former to assume the presidency of the port of Santander. Martín's resignation was effective from 20 January, while López Marcano accessed the post on 25 January, which was reorganized to take Tourism competences from the Education and Vocational Training portfolio.
On 11 March 2022, Health minister Miguel Rodríguez Gómez announced his resignation, over "personal" reasons. He was replaced in his post by Raúl Pesquera Cabezas on 16 March.
On 3 March 2023, Public works ministers José Luis Gochicoa announced his resignation after a long-running corruption scandal into his department was discovered. He was replaced by the Presidency Minister, Paula Fernández Viaña.

Council of Government
The Government of Cantabria is structured into the offices for the president, the vice president and nine ministries.

Notes

References

2019 establishments in Cantabria
Cabinets established in 2019
Cabinets of Cantabria